Shemesh is an Israeli sitcom aired by Channel 2 Keshet and produced by Teddy Productions from 1997 to 2004.

Premise
The series follows Nahum Shemesh, a young provincial man from the southern Israeli city of Beersheba who moves to central Tel Aviv where he opens a small restaurant, "The Empire of the Sun" (a play on the character's name, as Shemesh means sun in Hebrew, as well as a reference the 1987 Steven Spielberg film of the same name). Over the course of the series Shemesh, along with his friends and neighbors, attempt to navigate through their professional as well as personal lives as they try to find success in the big city. The series sets out to portray a cultural clash between two sides of Israeli society, as the provincial Shemesh is met with the urbanites of Tel Aviv and their "northern" sensibilities. The series also pokes fun as the various stereotypes associated with Jewish subethnicities, such as Romanian Jews being greedy misers, Georgian Jews being of low intelligence and Yemenite Jews being "primitive".

The premise of the show's episodes are usually either absurd or at the very least humorous, some examples include Shemesh buying Bar a video game made by the store owner named "Zultan: The Time Demon", where when the player loses time in real life goes backwards, another example is Sassi being recruited by the Shabak in spite of his lack of intelligence.

As well as drawing inspiration from various American sitcoms of the era, such as Married... With Children and Seinfeld, The series is largely inspired by the life story of its leading actor Zvika Hadar, a rising star at the time, having found success in the big city after growing up in Beersheba and moving to Tel Aviv, and the main character is portrayed as an exaggerated fictionalization of Hadar himself, sharing many characteristics with the actor such as his love of Israeli football team Hapoel Be'er Sheva.

Characters

Main Characters
Nachum Shemesh (Zvika Hadar): A miser of Romanian descent from Beersheba who moved to Tel Aviv to open a restaurant. An avid fan of the football club Hapoel Be'er Sheva, as well as the secret son of Hollywood actor Paul Newman, Shemesh goes through various misadventures throughout the series as he tries to bring success to his restaurant and his love life.   
Esther 'Etti' Hillel (Galit Giat): A waitress of Yemenite descent at the "Empire of the sun". Originally from Lod, Etti moved to Tel Aviv looking to become a famous actress, an ambition she pursues throughout the show's run, only finding modest success near the end of the show. She is the main love interest of Shemesh.
Sasson "Sassi" Feldman-Shvilly/Siton (Zvulun Moshiashvili): "The Empire's" cook, as well as Shemesh' personal assistant, from Ness Ziona. He is often the subject of ridicule, mainly from Shemesh, for his short stature and low intelligence, as well as his Georgian background. Despite his naïve and dimwitted nature he is portrayed as a loyal friend and a gifted chef. Is often seen with Ogen, and later Hemmi. He is later revelated to be the long lost son of the Georgian foreign minister.
Ogen Siton (Orly Weinerman): A dumb blonde stereotype, Ogen is a close friend and love interest of Sassi, with whom she is often seen. it is revealed in season 4 that her stupidity was merely an act created and assigned to her by the Mossad, although they too are baffled by her stupidity.
Yshayahu Tenzer (Gadi Rabinovich): The upstairs neighbor of Shemesh' restaurant. A lawyer with an affection for causing chaos and harm to others, as well as a deep love for pastrami sandwiches, Tenzer is often referred to as a "maniac" (מניאק), an Israeli slang word referring to an immoral and mean individual. Is often portrayed as having a friendly relationship with Shemesh, though it is often strained and sometimes borders on rivalry. Tenzer's name is taken from a character from the Shai Agnon short story "Different Faces".
Bar Sela (Eliad Nachum): A child who is best friends with Shemesh. He often hangs around at the Empire with Shemesh, as his mother is implied to be neglectful. Having both grown up without their fathers, Shemesh and Bar share a connection in which Shemesh serves as a sort of father figure in Bar's life, watches over him and teaches him his street wisdom throughout the series.

Secondary Characters
Every season introduces at least one new character to the main cast. Said characters will typically have a story arc revolving around them before leaving the cast before the end of the season, though some have stuck around for longer.

Rakefet Sela (Dana Shrier): Bar's often neglectful mother, a spiritual guru of French origin. During the first season she is portrayed as having a sort of friendly-rivalry with Shemesh, as well as a close friendship with Etti. After season 1 she is only seen in a few episodes, disappearing from the show completely outside of brief mentions after season 3, and a single appearance in an episode in Season 4 until the show's finale.
Mano Bari (Charlie Buzaglo): A handsome, charming student of philosophy who moves to Israel from Italy. During season 2 he develops a relationship with Etti. He is revealed to be Bar's biological father, having had a brief affair with Rakefet in Italy. 
Sivan (Dorit Bar Or): A former class mate and rival of Etti who begins dating and later becomes engaged to Shemesh in season 3. She is characterized as mean, bossy and with overly materialistic tendencies. Has little regard for Shemesh and his Beershebite sensibilities. 
Hemmi Alze/Siton (Yehezkel Lazarov): Copywriter and director of television commercials. He is portrayed as a Yuppie, seeking success in the Tel Avivi "scene". He is introduced in season 4 as a romantic rival for Sassi over Ogen. The love triangle is eventually resolved when Hemmi, Sassi and Ogen enter a threeway marriage, this marriage is based off of the system used for Channel 2, at the end of season 4. 
Marcus Emek (Arieh Moskona): Initially introduced as a wimpy career consultant for Tel Aviv University in season 2, Marcus is reintroduced in season 4 as a cunning business man, who is contacted by Shemesh to help save his failing restaurant. During the season he serves as the representative of the unknown Lessees of the Empire, only referred to as "the Koreans". He is overly touchy and lacks social awareness, but is shown to be shrewd and intelligent throughout the season, He is also constantly made fun of by the rest of the staff.   
Zoe (Moran Stavitzki): A hip, young club goer, Zoe moves into the building the show is set in at the beginning of season 5. Often represents the younger generation of the Tel Aviv community, partying, drinking and taking drugs, in contrast with the older main cast.   
Ravit Hillel (Sharon Durani): Etti's younger sister. Temporarily moves in with Etti and Shemesh in season 6. She is portrayed as irresponsible and promiscuous. Having recently returned from a long trip to India, she often indulges in hedonistic pleasures, prioritizing having fun over planning ahead in life.

References

Israeli television sitcoms
Channel 2 (Israeli TV channel) original programming
1990s Israeli television series
2000s Israeli television series
1997 Israeli television series debuts
2004 Israeli television series endings
Culture in Tel Aviv